Okenia mellita is a species of sea slug, specifically a dorid nudibranch, a marine gastropod mollusc in the family Goniodorididae.

Distribution
This species was described from New South Wales, Australia. It is known only from eastern Australia.

Description
This Okenia has a narrow body and five lateral papillae on each side. The body is bright orange and the tips of the mantle processes and the rhinophores are black.

Ecology
The diet of this species is unknown but is probably a bryozoan.

References

Goniodorididae
Gastropods described in 2004